Rustai-ye Shahid Kivan Mirshkari (also Romanized as Rūstāī-ye Shahīd Kīvān Mīrshkārī) is a village in Nakhlestan Rural District, in the Central District of Kahnuj County, Kerman Province, Iran. At the 2006 census, its population was 136, in 33 families.

References 

Populated places in Kahnuj County